Tianjin Medical University General Hospital is a general hospital in the central Heping District of the Chinese metropolis of Tianjin, associated with Tianjin Medical University.

External links 
 

Hospitals in Tianjin